Kavis (Sorani Kurdish: کاوه‌یس, also Romanized as Kāvīs and Kāweys; also known as Kāvos) is a village in Mangur-e Sharqi Rural District, Khalifan District, Mahabad County, West Azerbaijan Province, Iran. At the 2006 census, its population was 62, in 8 families.

References 

Populated places in Mahabad County